Sidi Yacoub may refer to:

Sidi Yacoub, Algeria
Sidi Yacoub, Morocco
Sidi Yacoub (footballer), Mauritanian footballer